The 2022 Open Championship, officially the 150th Open Championship, was a golf tournament played 14–17 July on the Old Course at St Andrews, Scotland. The championship was won by Cameron Smith with a score of 268, 20 under par, one stroke ahead of Cameron Young.

Originally scheduled for 15–18 July 2021, the championship was put back one year after the 2020 event was cancelled due to the COVID-19 pandemic, ensuring that the sesquicentennial celebration was at the "home of golf".

Organisation
The Open Championship is organised by the R&A, and is included in the PGA Tour, European Tour, and Japan Golf Tour calendars under the major championships category. The tournament is a 72-hole (4 rounds) stroke play competition held over 4 days, with 18 holes played each day. Play is in groups of three for the first two days, and groups of two in the final two days. Groupings for the first two days are decided by the organisers, with each group having one morning, and one afternoon tee time. On the final two days, players tee off in reverse order of aggregate score, with the leaders last. After 36 holes there was a cut, after which the top 70 and ties progress through to compete in the third and fourth rounds. In the event of a tie for the lowest score after four rounds, a four-hole aggregate playoff will be held to determine the winner; this will be followed by sudden-death extra holes if necessary until a winner emerges.

Venue

The 2022 event was the 30th Open Championship played at the Old Course at St Andrews. The most recent was in 2015, when Zach Johnson won the four-hole playoff for his second major title.

Previous lengths of the course for The Open Championship (since 1950):

 2015:  
 2010:  
 2005:  
 2000: 
 1995: 
 1990: 

 1984: 
 1978: 
 1970: 
 1964: 
 1960: 
 1955:

Field
The Open Championship field is made up of 156 players, who gained entry through various exemption criteria and qualifying tournaments. The criteria included past Open champions, recent major winners, top ranked players in the world rankings and from the leading world tours, and winners and high finishers from various designated tournaments, including the Open Qualifying Series; the winners of designated amateur events, including The Amateur Championship and U.S. Amateur, also gained exemption provided they remain an amateur. Anyone not qualifying via exemption, and had a handicap of 0.4 or lower, can gain entry through regional and final qualifying events.

Criteria and exemptions
Each player is classified according to the first category in which he qualified, but other categories are shown in parentheses.

1. The Open Champions aged 60 or under on 17 July 2022

Mark Calcavecchia
Stewart Cink (12)
Darren Clarke (2)
John Daly
David Duval
Ernie Els (2)
Pádraig Harrington
Zach Johnson (2)
Paul Lawrie
Shane Lowry (2,4,5,15)
Rory McIlroy (2,4,5,11,12,15)
Phil Mickelson (2,10)
Francesco Molinari (2,6)
Collin Morikawa (2,3,4,5,10,12,15)
Louis Oosthuizen (3,4,12)
Jordan Spieth (2,3,4,12,15)
Henrik Stenson (2)
Tiger Woods (9)

Ben Curtis, Todd Hamilton, and Justin Leonard did not play.

2. The Open Champions for 2011–2021

3. Top 10 finishers and ties in the 2021 Open Championship

Dylan Frittelli
Mackenzie Hughes
Dustin Johnson (4,9,12,15)
Brooks Koepka (4,8,10,12,15)
Robert MacIntyre (5)
Jon Rahm (4,5,8,12,15)
Scottie Scheffler (4,9,12,15)

Daniel Berger (4,12,15) did not play.

4. Top 50 players in the Official World Golf Ranking (OWGR) for Week 21, 2022

Abraham Ancer (5,12)
Keegan Bradley
Sam Burns (12)
Patrick Cantlay (12,15)
Paul Casey (5,15)
Corey Conners (12)
Bryson DeChambeau (8,12,15)
Harris English (12,15)
Tony Finau (12,15)
Matt Fitzpatrick (5,8,15)
Tommy Fleetwood (5,15)
Talor Gooch (OQS)
Tyrrell Hatton (5,6,15)
Russell Henley
Lucas Herbert (5)
Tom Hoge
Max Homa
Billy Horschel (5,6,12)
Viktor Hovland (5,12,15)
Im Sung-jae (12)
Kevin Kisner
Jason Kokrak (12)
Lee Kyoung-hoon
Marc Leishman
Hideki Matsuyama (9,12)
Kevin Na (12)
Joaquín Niemann (12)
Mito Pereira
Thomas Pieters (5)
Séamus Power
Patrick Reed (9,12)
Xander Schauffele (12,15)
Adam Scott
Webb Simpson
Cameron Smith (11,12)
Justin Thomas (10,11,12,15)
Cameron Tringale
Harold Varner III
Cameron Young
Will Zalatoris (5)

5. Top 30 in the final 2021 Race to Dubai standings

Alexander Björk
Richard Bland
Dean Burmester
Laurie Canter
Thomas Detry
Justin Harding
Garrick Higgo
Nicolai Højgaard
Min Woo Lee
Guido Migliozzi
Ian Poulter (15)
Jason Scrivener
Bernd Wiesberger (15)
Danny Willett (6)

Justin Rose did not play.

6. Recent winners of the BMW PGA Championship (2018–2021)

7. Top five players, not already exempt, within the top 20 of the 2022 DP World Tour Rankings through the BMW International Open

Adri Arnaus
Sam Horsfield
Pablo Larrazábal
Li Haotong
Jordan Smith

8. Recent winners of the U.S. Open (2017–2022)

Gary Woodland

9. Recent winners of the Masters Tournament (2017–2022)

Sergio García (12,15)

10. Recent winners of the PGA Championship (2016–2022)
Jimmy Walker did not play.

11. Recent winners of the Players Championship (2019–2022)

12. The top 30 players from the 2021 FedEx Cup Playoffs
Erik van Rooyen did not play.

13. Top five players, not already exempt, within the top 20 of the 2021–22 FedEx Cup points list through the Travelers Championship

14. Winner of the 2021 Visa Open de Argentina

Jorge Fernández-Valdés

15. Playing members of the 2021 Ryder Cup teams

Lee Westwood

16. Winner of the 2021–22 PGA Tour of Australasia Order of Merit

Jediah Morgan

17. Winner of the 2021–22 Sunshine Tour Order of Merit

Shaun Norris (18)

18. Winner of the 2021 Japan Open Golf Championship

19. Winner of the 2022 Asia Pacific Open Golf Championship Diamond Cup

Shugo Imahira

20. Top two players on the 2020–21 Japan Golf Tour Official Money List

Takumi Kanaya
Chan Kim

21. The top player, not already exempt, on the 2022 Japan Golf Tour Official Money List through the Japan Golf Tour Championship

Kazuki Higa

22. Winner of the 2021 Senior Open Championship

Stephen Dodd

23. Winner of the 2022 Amateur Championship

Aldrich Potgieter (a)

24. Winner of the 2021 U.S. Amateur

James Piot

25. Winner of the 2022 European Amateur

Filippo Celli (a)

26. Recipient of the 2021 Mark H. McCormack Medal

Keita Nakajima (a) (27)

27. Winner of the 2021 Asia-Pacific Amateur Championship

28. Winner of the 2022 Latin America Amateur Championship

Aaron Jarvis (a)

Open Qualifying Series
The Open Qualifying Series for the 2022 Open Championship consists of 12 events. Places are available to the leading players (not otherwise exempt) who finished in the top n and ties. In the event of ties, positions went to players ranked highest according to that week's OWGR.

Final Qualifying
Final Qualifying events were played on 28 June at four locations. Four qualifying places were available at each location, with 72 golfers competing at each.

Additional players added to the field
In order to fill additional places or replace exempt players who had withdrawn prior to the start of the Championship, and maintain the full field of 156, additional players were either taken in ranking order from Official World Golf Ranking at the time they were added, or from Final Qualifying.

From the Week 26 (26 June) Official World Golf Ranking:

Aaron Wise (ranked 45)
Brian Harman (49)
Sebastián Muñoz (50)
Sepp Straka (55)
Luke List (60)
Kim Si-woo (62)

From the Week 27 (3 July) Official World Golf Ranking:

Sahith Theegala (62)
Rikuya Hoshino (71)
Aaron Rai (127)

Round summaries

First round
Thursday, 14 July 2022

PGA Tour rookie Cameron Young had a two-shot lead after a bogey-free round of 8 under par, two shots ahead of pre-tournament favourite Rory McIlroy. Defending champion Collin Morikawa opened with a level-par 72 while three-time winner Tiger Woods double-bogeyed the first and continued to struggle there on, finishing at 6 over.

Second round
Friday, 15 July 2022

Cameron Smith took the lead on a score of 131, the lowest 36-hole score in Open Championship history at St. Andrews. Cameron Young fell to second place, two strokes behind, after a second-round 69. Viktor Hovland and Rory McIlroy were a further stroke behind in a tie for third place. 83 players made the cut of level par, including four amateurs. Defending champion Collin Morikawa missed the cut by a stroke.

Third round
Saturday, 16 July 2022

Viktor Hovland and  Rory McIlroy each shot rounds of 66 to tie for first after the third round at −16. Cameron Smith, who shot 73, and Cameron Young, who shot 71, dropped back to four strokes behind at −12. McIlroy was trying for his second Open title and first major victory in eight years while Hovland was looking for his first major.

Final round
Sunday, 17 July 2022

Summary
Cameron Smith came from four strokes behind to win the Open. He made eight birdies in his round of 64, which was joint low round of the tournament, and was the lowest final round score by a champion at St Andrews. Cameron Young made an eagle on the final hole to finish one stroke back. Rory McIlroy, third round co-leader, managed only two birdies in his round and finished a further stroke behind. Viktor Hovland, the other third round co-leader, shot a two-over-par 74 to finish tied for fourth with Tommy Fleetwood. Smith's total of 20 under par tied the to-par recond in a major, last reached by Dustin Johnson at the 2020 Masters Tournament.

Final leaderboard

Scorecard
Final round

Cumulative tournament scores, relative to par
{|class="wikitable" span = 50 style="font-size:85%;
|-
|style="background: Red;" width=10|
|Eagle
|style="background: Pink;" width=10|
|Birdie
|style="background: PaleGreen;" width=10|
|Bogey
|}

Notes

References

External links

Coverage on the European Tour's official site
Coverage on the PGA Tour's official site

The Open Championship
Golf tournaments in Scotland
Open Championship
Open Championship
Open Championship